Abdul Hussein (also transliterated as Abd al-Husayn, Abdolhossein, or Abdul Husayn) is a masculine Muslim given name, the name is built from the Arabic words Abd, al- and Hussein, and means Servant of Hussein. It is commonly associated with Shi'ites, who especially revere Hussein ibn Ali. The name is forbidden for Sunnis, who may not use any names implying servitude to anything besides God. It may refer to:

Given name
 Abdulhussain Abdulredha (1939–2017), Kuwaiti actor
 Abdolhossein Behnia, Iranian politician
 Abdol-Hossein Farmanfarma (1859–1939), Qajar prince
 Abdolhossein Hazhir (1899–1949), Iranian politician
 Abdol Hossein Hejazi (1904–1969), Iranian military officer
 Abdul Husain Husamuddin (1823–1891), Indian, Da'i al-Mutlaq of Dawoodi Bohra sect
 Abdolhossein Moezi (born 1945), Iranian scholar
 Abdolhossein Mokhtabad (born 1966), Iranian composer
 Abd al-Husayn Sharaf al-Din al-Musawi (1290–1377), Shi'a twelver Islamic scholar
 Abdol Hossein Sardari (1895–1981), Iranian statesman 
 Abdolhossein Sepanta (1907–1969), Iranian film director
 Abdolhossein Teymourtash (1883–1933), Iranian politician
 Abdolhossein Zarrinkoob (1923–1999), Iranian literary scholar

Middle name
Abdulaziz Abdulhussein Sachedina, Tanzanian-born professor
Ammar Abdul-Hussein Al-Asadi (born 1993), Iraqi footballer

Surname
 Alaa Abdul-Hussein (born 1986), Iraqi footballer
 Hussain Abdul-Hussain, Lebanese journalist

See also
Abdolreza
Abdul Zahra

Arabic masculine given names
Iranian masculine given names